
Omoro Lake is an Amazon lagoon located in Canton Magdalena, Magdalena Municipality, Iténez Province, Beni Department, Bolivia. At an elevation of 193 m. It has an elongated shape, with dimensions of 4 km long by 2 km wide and a surface area of 6 km².

References 

Lakes of Beni Department